The ATLAS-TIM AT 32 was the process computer developed by Mihajlo Pupin Institute in Belgrade in the 1980s. The designers were Dr Vukasin Masnikosa, Dr Bozidar Levi, Mr Milenko Nikolic and their associates. Professor Bozidar Levi with 2 coauthors got the Nikola Tesla award for his ATLAS design in 1988.

The SCADA (Supervisory, Control And Data Acquisition) software systems, such as SCADA VIEW 6000 and SCADA VIEW2, were used in many Serbian Hydro and Termal Power plants. The SCADA hardware developed and manufactured in the M. Pupin Institute includes ATLAS AT 32 (with Intel 386 microprocessors and VLSI circuitry), ATLAS MAX PLC (Intel 486), ATLAS MTU, Programmable controllers TIMKO), Atlas-2000, ATLAS XP, ATLAS-NANO, pico-ATLAS modular RTU devices etc.

References

External links
 
 Technical description

Computing by computer model
Mihajlo Pupin Institute
Serbian inventions